Domenico Carattino (9 September 1920 – 13 November 2004) was an Italian sailor who competed in the 1968 Summer Olympics.

References

External links
 

1920 births
2004 deaths
Italian male sailors (sport)
Olympic sailors of Italy
Sailors at the 1968 Summer Olympics – 5.5 Metre